Gilles Bourdos (born 1963) is a French film director, screenwriter and producer. He is best known for his atmospheric cinema, which uses troubling themes in contrast with strong aesthetic imagery. He was one of the founders of the French production company Persona Films which produced most of his early work. Bourdos often collaborates with filmmaker Michel Spinosa, cinematographer Mark Lee Ping Bin and musician Alexandre Desplat.

Life and career
Bourdos, who was born in Nice, France, made his feature film début at the 1998 Cannes Film Festival with Disparus (1998), a political thriller and love triangle during the Surrealist movement in Paris in 1938.   His second critically acclaimed feature, Inquietudes (2003), is based on the Ruth Rendell novel A Sight for Sore Eyes and stars Gregoire Colin and Julie Ordon.   His first English language film, Afterwards (2008), featured Evangeline Lilly, John Malkovich, and Romain Duris, and was based on the French bestseller Et Après... by Guillaume Musso.

His widely acclaimed 2012 film Renoir competed in the Un Certain Regard section at the 2012 Cannes Film Festival. The film tells the forgotten story of Andree Heuschling, also known as Catherine Hessling, who was the last model of the impressionist painter Pierre-Auguste Renoir and the first actor in the films of his son, the director Jean Renoir. The story is set in the south of France during World War I.  The film stars Michel Bouquet, Christa Theret, and Vincent Rottiers. Renoir was selected as the French entry for the Best Foreign Language Film at the 86th Academy Awards, but was not nominated.

Filmography

References

External links 

 
 https://www.nytimes.com/2013/02/28/movies/inside-the-rendez-vous-with-french-cinema-series.html?pagewanted=all
 http://www.theupcoming.co.uk/2013/03/04/film-review-renoir/
 http://www.hollywoodreporter.com/review/renoir-film-review-331147
 http://www.festival-cannes.fr/en/archives/artist/id/22092.html Cannes Film Festival

French film directors
Living people
People from Nice
French male screenwriters
French screenwriters
1963 births
French film producers